Bobby Joe Edmonds (March 8, 1941 – November 12, 1991) was a professional basketball small forward for two seasons in the American Basketball Association (ABA) as a member of the Indiana Pacers (1967–68, 1969–70). He attended Tennessee State University.

He was drafted by the Baltimore Bullets in the 1964 NBA draft

He attended Indianapolis' Crispus Attucks High School, where he was part of the IHSAA State Championship basketball team in 1958–59.

References

External links
 

1941 births
1991 deaths
American men's basketball players
Basketball players from Indianapolis
Baltimore Bullets (1963–1973) draft picks
Indiana Pacers players
Small forwards
Tennessee State Tigers basketball players